Căinari is a town in Căușeni District, Moldova. One village is administered by the town, Căinari station.

International relations

Twin towns — Sister cities
Căinari is twinned with:
  Murfatlar, Romania

References

Cities and towns in Moldova
Bendersky Uyezd
Căușeni District